The 1926 Maryland gubernatorial election was held on November 2, 1926. Incumbent Democrat Albert Ritchie defeated Republican nominee Addison E. Mullikin with 57.93% of the vote.

General election

Candidates
Major party candidates
Albert Ritchie, Democratic
Addison E. Mullikin, Republican 

Other candidates
P. G'ustave Dill, Socialist

Results

References

1926
Maryland
Gubernatorial